Bisnis Indonesia (lit. Indonesian Business) is a daily business newspaper published in Jakarta, Indonesia. It is published by PT Jurnalindo Aksara Grafika, a subsidiary of Bisnis Indonesia Group originally founded by three conglomerate businessmen in Indonesia: Sukamdani Sahid Gitosardjono (Sahid Group), Ciputra (Ciputra Group), Anthony Salim (Salim Group), and media veteran Eric FH Samola. The first business newspaper in the country, its first edition was published on December 14, 1985. 

Bisnis Indonesia primarily covers Indonesian financial and business news, as well as issues around. The paper also supplied news content for international news agency, including Japan-based NewsNet Asia, Factiva, ISI Emerging Markets, Chinese news agency Xinhua, and Bloomberg.

Hery Trianto is now chief editor and Chamdan Purwoko is deputy chief editor.

History
Bisnis Indonesia opened its first office in an ex Singer's sewing machine service center at Jalan Kramat V/8, Central Jakarta. The newspaper gained its momentum from the rise of stock market in 1987 and new policy in banking known as Paket Oktober (Pakto) 1988. Bisnis Indonesia shifted their coverage to focus on micro-economics and business news, in the time when most competitors still reporting heavily on macro-economics issue. This strategy prove fruitful as stock exchange authority ordered all public listed companies to publish their financial reports and corporate actions.

External links
Official site

Newspapers established in 1985
Business newspapers
Newspapers published in Jakarta
1985 establishments in Indonesia
Business in Indonesia